Hancock Pass, elevation , is a high mountain pass on the Continental Divide in western Colorado. The pass is on the border between Chaffee and Gunnison counties and between the Gunnison and San Isabel national forests. 

The road over the pass is of moderate difficulty and is very rocky and slow going.

References

Mountain passes of Colorado
Landforms of Gunnison County, Colorado
Landforms of Chaffee County, Colorado
Great Divide of North America
Transportation in Gunnison County, Colorado
Transportation in Chaffee County, Colorado